Appassionata (also known as Passionate) is a 1974 Italian erotic drama film. Two teenage friends conspire to find out how much their youthful sensuality can disrupt one of their households, headed by a dentist and his mentally-ill wife. The film is directed by Gianluigi Calderone and written by Gianluigi Calderone, Alessandro Parenzo and Domenico Rafele

Plot
Emilio is a dentist whose mentally unbalanced wife never goes out, spending much of the day at her piano. Their daughter Eugenia brings home a school friend, Nicola, who is sympathetic towards the mother but also tries quick sex with the father. Perhaps jealous, Eugenia then tries to seduce her father. When the mother eventually has to be placed in a clinic, it is Nicola who puts the grieving Emilio to bed. In the morning, it is Eugenia who gets out of his bed and the two girls put on their uniforms to go off to school.

Cast
Gabriele Ferzetti as Dr. Emilio Rutelli 
Ornella Muti as 	Eugenia Rutelli
Eleonora Giorgi	 as 	Nicola
Valentina Cortese	 as Elisa Rutelli
Ninetto Davoli	 as 	Butcher's Boy
 Jeanine Martinovic as 
 Renata Zamengo as  assistant
 Carla Mancini as  patient
  as

References

External links

1974 films
1970s Italian-language films
Italian erotic drama films
1970s erotic drama films
Films scored by Piero Piccioni
1974 drama films
Films directed by Gianluigi Calderone

Incest in film
1970s Italian films